Edgar Wreford (29 December 1923 – 20 January 2006) was an English stage and television actor.

Biography 
He trained at the Old Vic School and went on to have a long and distinguished career on stage.

His television roles included guest appearances in The Avengers, Van der Valk, Edward the Seventh, Lillie and Blake's 7.

Wreford spent his final years at the actors retirement home Denville Hall, where he died in 2006 after a long battle with Parkinson's disease.

Partial filmography
Suspended Alibi (1957) - Prison Chaplain
An Age of Kings (1960) - John of Gaunt 
The Knack ...and How to Get It (1965) - Man in Phone Booth

References

External links
 

1923 births
2006 deaths
English male stage actors
English male television actors